Nicole Ramalalanirina (born 5 March 1972 in Antananarivo, Madagascar) is a French athlete who specializes in the 100 metres hurdles. She changed nationality from her native Madagascar in 1998.

Her personal best time in the 100 metres hurdles is 12.76 seconds, achieved in November 2000 in La Chaux-de-Fonds.

Nicole competed in the Olympic Games four times, twice for Madagascar(1992, 1996) and twice for France(2000, 2004).

Her best Olympic result was a 6th place in the 100m high hurdles at Sydney in 2000 with a time of 12.91.

Nicole finished her career by winning the French Indoor National 60m Hurdles championship in both 2004 and 2006.

Competition record

References

 

1972 births
Living people
French female hurdlers
Malagasy female hurdlers
Athletes (track and field) at the 1992 Summer Olympics
Athletes (track and field) at the 1996 Summer Olympics
Athletes (track and field) at the 2000 Summer Olympics
Athletes (track and field) at the 2004 Summer Olympics
Olympic athletes of Madagascar
Olympic athletes of France
Malagasy emigrants to France
People from Antananarivo
World Athletics Championships athletes for Madagascar
World Athletics Championships athletes for France
African Games bronze medalists for Madagascar
African Games medalists in athletics (track and field)
Universiade medalists in athletics (track and field)
Athletes (track and field) at the 1991 All-Africa Games
Universiade medalists for Madagascar
Medalists at the 1993 Summer Universiade
Medalists at the 1995 Summer Universiade